Pandavas: The Five Warriors is a 2000 Indian English-language animated Hindu mythological film directed by Usha Ganesh Raja and produced by Pentamedia Graphics. Based on the five Pandava brothers from the Indian epic Mahabharata, it is India's first computer animated film, and won the National Film Award for Best Feature Film in English.

Plot 
King Pandu ruled Hastinapur but has to leave the kingdom due to a curse. He is unable to have a child, but his wife Kunti has a boon that she could have children by praying to the gods. They invoke the gods of the elements and had three children: Dharma, Bhima, and Arjun. Pandu's other wife, Madri, also has two twin sons by praying: Nakul and Sahadev. The five sons became known as the Pandavas. King Pandu has a blind brother, King Dhiru, whose wife gives birth to 101 children, known as the Kauravas.

King Pandu dies due to his curse and instructs Kunti to take the five children to Hastinapur so Dhiru can take care of them. The cousins all grow up attending school together. From a young age, Bhim demonstrates his strength and Arjun demonstrates his skill in archery. Dhuri becomes jealous of the Pandava brothers. The cousins' uncle, Shakuni, excites Dhuri. He plans to light a palace with the Pandavas in it on fire. Arjuna is sceptical of the palace, and a well-wisher warns them, telling them to find the tunnel for an escape route. When the palace is lit on here, the Pandavas and their mother manage to escape into the forest but everyone believes they died in an unfortunate accident.

In the forest, the Pandavas learn about a demon who terrorises and devours people. Bhima instigates her by eating the food she had prepared for herself. After a quarrel in which he kills her, the demoness transforms into a princess. She thanks Bhima for saving her. She was a princess who got cursed by a scholar for making fun of him due to her vanity. The scholar said she would be saved by a true saviour, and that she would marry the one who saved her.

King Panchala conducts a ceremony to find a suitor for his daughter, Panchali. The Pandavas attend in disguise and Arjuna wins the competition. Dhuri also attends recognises them. Dhiru tells him to invite them to their palace apologise, while Shakuni suggests they invite the Pandavas to kill them another way this time. The Pandavas arrive, and Dhuri gives them a separate small palace in Indraprastha. The palace is built of illusions, so when Dhuri visits, he thinks he is stepping on the floor but he falls into a pool of water. Panchali laughs at him, and he feels insulted. This incident sparks his desire for war against the Pandavas.

Dhuri tells Shakuni he seeks revenge. Shakuni advises him that the family will look down on Dhuri starting a war, but that he has a better idea. Shakuni arranges for a game of gambling between the cousins, with loaded dice unbeknownst to the Pandavas. In the heat of the moment, Dharma loses and has to give his kingdom up to Dhuri and Shakuni. In an effort to win back his kingdom, Dharma loses his brothers, palace, and finally Panchali, too. The brothers become slaves to Dhuri and Shakuni. Dhuri begins to disrobe Panchali to humiliate her. She prays to Krishna, who ensures her cloth does not run out and protects her honour.

The Pandavas go into exile in the forest for thirteen years. After their twelfth year in the forest, Yaksha appears to Sahadev and says he must answers questions before drinking water from the lake. Sahadev does not comply, so when he drinks the water, he falls dead. The other brothers also fail to answer the questions before drinking. Dharma answers satisfactorily, and Yaksha resurrects all of his brothers.

After the thirteen years of exile are over, Dhuri refuses to give the Pandavas back their kingdom. In consulting Krishna, Dhuri asks for a large army and Arjun asks for Krishna to be his charioteer. Arjuna expresses his hesitation in fighting against his family, but Krishna explains to him about his duty and the nature of life and death. When Arjuna's son Abhi enters the battlefield, Dhuri unfairly kills him. Krishna devises a plan to help defeat Dronacharya, by spreading the news that Ashwatthama has been killed. Karna uses his most powerful weapon on Bhim's son, Ghatot, which means he cannot use it on Arjuna.

In a fit of rage, Dhuri violates the code of conduct and sets the Pandava's tents on fire, but Krishna protects them with rain. Dhuri jumps into a river to avoid being killed. Krishna tricks him into thinking it is beyond sunset, after which he comes out and fights with Bhima. Bhima kills him and the Pandavas rule Hastinapur righteously and justly.

Production 
Pandavas: The Five Warriors is the first computer animated theatrical film to be produced by an Indian company — the Chennai-based multimedia and graphics company Pentamedia Graphics, as well as the first computer animated adaptation of the Mahabharata. As the film was mainly targeted at western audiences, the character Duryodhana was renamed "Dhuri", and Yuddhishstia was renamed "Dharm". Focusing mainly on the story of the Pandava brothers, the majority of episodes in the Mahabharata were downplayed. Krishna's role in the life of the Pandavas did not receive emphasis either, and the film makes only a "passing reference" to the Bhagavad Gita. Ilaiyaraaja was signed to compose the film's music, and J. D.–Jerry were signed as the creative directors. Sujatha was chosen as the screenwriter, while B. Lenin and V. T. Vijayan were signed as the editors.

Release and reception 
Pandavas: The Five Warriors was released on 23 December 2000, and its television rights were acquired by Cartoon Network, where it aired in both English and Hindi languages. S. R. Ashok Kumar of The Hindu positively reviewed the film and its technical aspects, saying "Each and every frame of the nearly 110-minute-long picture is a marvel and it is the best form of expression on celluloid." The film won the Second Best Animated Feature Film Award in Vancouver Effects & Animation Festival, 2001, and the National Film Award for Best Feature Film in English.

See also 
 Indian animation industry
 List of Indian animated films

References

External links 
 
 

2000 computer-animated films
2000 films
2000s English-language films
2000s war films
Animated films based on Mahabharata
Best English Feature Film National Film Award winners
English-language Indian films
Films scored by Ilaiyaraaja
Hindu mythological films
Indian animated films
Indian computer-animated films
Indian war films